HealthEquity, Inc. is an American financial technology and business services company that is designated as a non-bank health savings trustee by the IRS. This designation allows HealthEquity to be the custodian of health savings accounts regardless of which financial institution the funds are deposited with.

As of July 31, 2022, HealthEquity managed 7.5 million HSA accounts, plus 7 million other consumer-directed benefits ("CDBs") for total accounts of 14.5 million. Total HSA assets as of July 31, 2022 were $20.5 billion, including $13.1 billion of HSA cash and $7.4 billion of HSA investments.

History 
HealthEquity was incorporated in January 2002 in Tucson, Arizona by Stephen Neeleman, Nuno Battaglia, and David Hall to re-introduce consumer-driven health care (CDH). It moved its incorporation to Utah in February 2004. HealthEquity went public via an IPO on July 31, 2014 under the symbol "HQY".

Acquisitions 
August 30, 2019 - HealthEquity acquires WageWorks.

March 8, 2021 HealthEquity acquires Luum and expands Commuter benefit offering. 

November 1, 2021: HealthEquity completes Further acquisition.

References

External links 
 
 User Experience Benchmarks and Best Practices: Inside Bank Health Savings Account Servicing Web Sites
 The Complete HSA Guidebook

Medicare and Medicaid (United States)
Medical and health organizations based in Utah
Health care companies established in 2002
2014 initial public offerings